The Christmas Offensive took place during the Second Italo-Ethiopian War.  The Ethiopian offensive was more of a counteroffensive to an ever-slowing Italian offensive which started the war.

Background
On the 3 October 1935, Italian General Emilio De Bono invaded Abyssinia. De Bono's advance continued methodically, deliberately, and, to the consternation of Italian dictator Benito Mussolini, somewhat slowly. On the 8 November, the I Corps and the Eritrean Corps captured Makale. This proved to be the limit of how far the Italian invaders would progress under the command of De Bono. Increasing pressure from the rest of the world on Mussolini caused him to need quick victories, and he was not prepared to hear of obstacles or delays from De Bono.

On the 16 November, De Bono was promoted to the rank of Marshal of Italy (Maresciallo d'Italia); however, in December he was replaced by Marshal Pietro Badoglio on the northern front because of the slow, cautious nature of De Bono's advance.

The offensive
On the 30 November 1935, Nəgusä Nägäst Haile Selassie moved his field headquarters to Dessie. From there, he decided to test this new Italian commander with an offensive of his own. Haile Selassie's test was launched on the 15 December and became known as the Ethiopian "Christmas Offensive".

Objectives
The "Christmas Offensive" had as its objectives the splitting of the Italian forces in the north with the Ethiopian center, crushing the Italian left with the Ethiopian right, and invading Eritrea with the Ethiopian left. Ras Seyoum Mangasha held the area around Abbi Addi with about 30,000 men. On the 5 December, Abbi Addi had fallen to the Italians and, on 22 December, Ras Seyoum took it back.

Ras Imru Haile Selassie with approximately 40,000 men advanced from Gojjam toward Mai Timket to the left of Ras Seyoum. In a push towards Warieu Pass, Ras Kassa Haile Darge with approximately 40,000 men advanced from Gondar to support Ras Seyoum in the center. Ras Mulugeta Yeggazu, the Minister of War, advanced from Dessie with approximately 80,000 men to take positions on and around Amba Aradam to the right of Ras Seyoum. Amba Aradam was a steep sided, flat topped mountain directly in the way of an Italian advance on Addis Ababa.

The four commanders had approximately 190,000 men facing approximately 125,000 Italians and Eritreans. Ras Imru and his Army of Gojjam was on the Ethiopian left, Ras Seyoum and his Army of Tigre and Ras Kassa and his Army of Begemder in the center, and Ras Mulugeta and the Mahel Sefari on the right.

The ambitious Ethiopian plan called for Ras Kassa and Ras Seyoum to split the Italian army in two and isolate the Italian I Army Corps and the Italian III Army Corps in Makale. Ras Mulugeta would then descend from Amba Aradam and crush both corps. According to this plan, after Ras Imru retook Adwa, he was to invade Eritrea.

Battle at Dembeguina Pass
On the 4 December 1935, as Ras Imru advanced from Gojjam, his forces were bombed for the first time.  Badly shaken by the bombing, about half his army abandoned him to return to Gojjam. Imru then entered the territory of Fitawrari Ayalew Birru and Imru's force was joined by Ayalew and his forces. Selassie, who was in Dessie at the time, sent a message via aircraft, ordering Ayalew to halt his attacks along the Setit and to advance with Imru's forces on the Tekezé River. The river valley divided Italian-held western Tigre from the Begemder, another river which flowed through a deep gorge. As a ruse, Imru dispatched a column in the opposite direction—northwest—during the daytime. The Italians observed its direction and attacked it with aircraft, while Imru and Birru took the rest of their men northeast during the nighttime. Just before dawn on 15 December the Ethiopian force crossed the Tekezé at two fords. Imru's 2,000-strong advance guard went across without facing any opposition. Nine miles upstream Birru's advance guard, led by Fitaurari Shifferaw, crossed at Mai Timchet and eliminated a small Italian stone fort before proceeding up the Gondar-Adowa mule track towards the Dembeguina Pass, which was garrisoned by the Italian Gruppo Bande Altopiani, despite orders from Birru not to move past the ford. Shortly after dawn they encountered an Italian horseback patrol. The Ethiopians quickly opened fire and when the patrol retreated they charged, until Shifferaw ordered them to halt.

The commander of the Gruppo Bande Altopiani, Major Criniti, requested air support from the Italian forces in Axum and bolstered his garrison by deploying a squadron of light tanks. One tank was dispatched to scout the area below the pass. Shifferaw ordered his men to hold their fire, but they were eager to shoot and ignored their commander's instruction. When the tank returned fire with its dual machine guns, most of Shifferaw's men broke and fled. One Ethiopian soldier boarded the tank and began banging on the turret and demanding that the occupants open it. As the driver of the tank reversed, the gunners opened the turret and the soldier decapitated them with his sword. Watching from the pass, the Italians were alarmed by what they had seen and decided to attempt a break-out through the Ethiopian lines with their nine remaining tanks. When the Italians advanced 2,000 of Shifferaw's men began to retreat. He accosted them, saying, "Are you women? Can't you see that I'm here?" and then rallied them with his horn. In the ensuing clash Criniti was wounded and two Italian officers were killed before the rest retreated back to the pass.

Completely encircled, the Italians tried to distract the Ethiopians with potential loot by sending their pack mules out of their camp. The plan failed, and the Ethiopians followed the mules back to the Italian camp, killing the wounded and looting the supplies there. With most of their officers dead, the remaining Italian troops gathered on a hill and raised their hands to indicate their surrender. The Ethiopians did not understand the gesture and killed the unarmed soldiers. The rest of the Italians then rushed down the hill to their tanks and attempted to board lorries to escape. Shifferaw was killed, but his father—who had accompanied him to the battle—told the hesitant Ethiopian troops that he was alive and had given an order to pursue the Italians. At the base of the hill the Ethiopians overturned the Italians' lorries and set them ablaze. They also overturned and destroyed three tanks and captured another three intact. One of the tank crews was killed when the Ethiopians boarded their vehicle, another crew was shot as they attempted to escape over a river, and the third crew was spared when they exited their tank shouting "Cristos". The Italian Eritrean colonial troops hid behind vehicles and trees while the Ethiopians attempted to hunt them down.

At 16:00 Imru's force arrived at the battle, and together the Ethiopians captured another two Italian tanks and killed their crews. The combined Ethiopian force then closely pursued the Eritrean troops five miles up the road to Enda Selassie. After clearing the town they paused to rest. Since Italian-held Axum was only 30 miles away, they eventually resumed their advance. At the same time, an Italian Blackshirt paramilitary column of trucks and ten tanks was dispatched from Axum to conduct a counter-attack. The Ethiopians ambushed the column two or three miles outside of Enda Selassie, blocking its path by rolling boulders across the road. They killed the driver of the lead tank, immobilising it. Two other tanks attempted to maneuver around it but slipped off the road and became stuck. The Ethiopians set two other tanks on fire captured two more Italians. The rest of the column retreated. On 16 December the Ethiopians advanced until they were only 12 miles from Axum and took up position along a ridge.

Ethiopian morale was high after the battle, which had proven that they could fight the Italians effectively. The Ethiopians claimed to have killed 500 Italian and Eritrean troops, and captured 50 machine guns, much to the pleasure of Imru, since his army possessed none. The capture of Enda Selassie also gave the Ethiopians a commanding position over the Tekezé fords, and after the battle the remainder of Imru's and Birru's armies hurried across the river.

Accomplishments
In addition to Ras Imru's advance on the left, the other Ethiopian armies had made progress during the offensive as well. Ras Kassa advanced to Abbi Addi and joined up with Ras Seyoum in the center. On the right, Ras Mulugeta and the Mahel Sefari was advancing directly towards the Italian positions at Makale. The Italians were forced to fall back from the Tekezé to Axum and from Amba Tzellene to the Warieu Pass.

Generally bad news for Italy
The news from the "northern front" was generally bad for Italy. However, foreign correspondents in Addis Ababa publicly took up knitting to mock their lack of access to the front. There was no way for them to verify reports that 4,700 Italians had been captured. The correspondents were told by the Ethiopians that Italian tanks had been stranded and abandoned and that Italian native troops were mutinying. Later, a report was issued that Ethiopian warriors had captured eighteen tanks, thirty-three field guns, 175 machine guns, and 2,605 rifles. In addition, this report indicated that the Ethiopians had wiped out an entire legion of the 2nd CC.NN. Division "28 Ottobre" and that the Italians had lost at least 3,000 men. Rome denied these figures.

The news for the Italians from the "southern front" was no better. By the end of the year, it was general knowledge at every marketplace that Ras Desta Damtew was massing an army to invade Italian Somaliland.

Black period of the war for Italy
The Christmas Offensive was a time that informed circles in Italy termed the "Black Period" of the war.  Badoglio's inability to get the Italians back on the offensive immediately caused Mussolini to fly into a rage, and he threatened to replace Badoglio with General Rodolfo Graziani.

On 18 December, millions of Italians participated in what was known as the "Harvest of Gold". To raise money for the war and as a pledge of faith to the Fascist regime, they handed over their wedding rings. In exchange for bands made of gold, they were given rings made of steel, with even the Queen participating in the pledge.

Chemical warfare
The Ethiopian offensive was ultimately stopped due to the Italian forces' superior modern weapons, such as machine guns and heavy artillery. More importantly, on 26 December, Badoglio asked for and was given permission to use chemical warfare agents such as mustard gas. The Italians delivered the poison gas by special artillery canisters and with bombers of the Italian Air Force. While the poorly equipped Ethiopians experienced some success against modern weaponry, they did not understand the "terrible rain that burned and killed".

Formal complaint
On 30 December, Haile Selassie formally filed a complaint with the League of Nations. He claimed that Italy's use of poison gas was yet another addition to the long list of international agreements contravened by Italy. In response, the Italians denied that poison gas was being used and, instead, decried the use of "dum dum" bullets and the mis-use of the Red Cross by the Ethiopians.

Aftermath
In early January 1936, the Ethiopian forces on the "northern front" were in the hills everywhere overlooking the Italian positions and launching attacks against them on a regular basis.  Mussolini was impatient for an Italian offensive to get under way and for the Ethiopians to be swept from the field.  In response to his frequent exhortations, Badoglio cabled Mussolini:  "It has always been my rule to be meticulous in preparation so that I may be swift in action."

Fortunately for the Italians on the "southern front", Ras Desta Damtew did little in 1935 and his invasion of Italian Somaliland did not get under way until early January 1936. By then his army had been reduced to approximately 15,000 men, less than one-quarter of its size when first raised in Sidamo Province. Ultimately, Desta Damtew's offensive became known as the disastrous Battle of Genale Doria.

In addition to being granted permission to use poison gas, Badoglio received additional ground forces; elements of the Italian III and IV Corps arrived in Eritrea during early 1936. What followed was a series of battles starting with the First Battle of Tembien. On 20 January, the beginning of the inconclusive First Battle of Tembien marked the end of the Ethiopian "Christmas Offensive" and also marked a shift of the offensive back to the Italians.

See also
 Ethiopian Order of Battle Second Italo-Abyssinian War
 Army of the Ethiopian Empire
List of Second Italo-Ethiopian War weapons of Ethiopia
 Italian Order of Battle Second Italo-Abyssinian War
List of Italian military equipment in the Second Italo-Ethiopian War
 Royal Italian Army

Notes 
Footnotes

Citations

References

External links

1935 in Ethiopia
1936 in Ethiopia
Conflicts in 1935
Battles of the Second Italo-Ethiopian War
December 1935 events
January 1936 events
Conflicts in 1936